José Sobral Júnior (born 9 March 1979) is a Brazilian rower. He competed in the men's lightweight double sculls event at the 2004 Summer Olympics.

References

1979 births
Living people
Brazilian male rowers
Olympic rowers of Brazil
Rowers at the 2004 Summer Olympics
Rowers from Rio de Janeiro (city)
Pan American Games medalists in rowing
Pan American Games silver medalists for Brazil
Rowers at the 2003 Pan American Games